Hyperolius pseudargus, also known as the Mette's reed frog, is a species of frogs in the family Hyperoliidae. It is endemic to south-central Tanzania and occurs in the Udzungwa Mountains and south to Njombe in the Southern Highlands. Male Hyperolius pseudargus greatly resemble Hyperolius argus but have less webbing between the toes and the male advertisement call is different. The vernacular name refers to Mette Westergaard, Danish biologist who collected the holotype and is the junior describer of this species.

Description
Males measure  in snout–vent length. The body and head are broad and flat. The eyes are not very protruding. Webbing between the toes is reduced. The dorsum is green with narrow yellow canthal and dorsolateral stripes, although these may sometimes be indistinct; small yellow dots are usually present. The upper eyelid is yellow or slightly reddish. The ventrum is yellow. The toes and fingers are yellow-green. Males have a large vocal sac that is bluish when calling, yellow green otherwise.

The male advertisement call is a fast series of very loud, harsh clicks, emitted in a somewhat accelerating rhythm.

Habitat and conservation
Breeding takes place in small pools and males call from sedges near water and from floating vegetation.

This species is common. Although its range is small, it is adaptable and is not facing significant threats. It might occur in the Udzungwa Mountains National Park.

References

pseudargus
Frogs of Africa
Endemic fauna of Tanzania
Taxa named by Arne Schiøtz
Amphibians described in 1999
Taxonomy articles created by Polbot